The 1942 Nebraska gubernatorial election was held on November 3, 1942, and featured incumbent Governor Dwight Griswold, a Republican, defeating Democratic nominee, former Governor Charles W. Bryan, to win a second two-year term in office.

Democratic primary

Candidates
Charles W. Bryan, former Governor and mayor of Lincoln
Roy M. Harrop
Stanley D. Long, Regent of the University of Nebraska

Results

Republican primary

Candidates
Dwight Griswold, incumbent Governor
Charles J. Warner, former Speaker of the Nebraska Legislature

Results

General election

Results

References

Gubernatorial
1942
Nebraska